The Oldsmobile Custom Cruiser is an automobile that was manufactured and marketed by Oldsmobile in three generations from 1971 until 1992. The first full-size station wagon produced by Oldsmobile since the 1964 Oldsmobile 88 Fiesta, the Custom Cruiser was slotted above the intermediate Oldsmobile Vista Cruiser in size, and the mid-size Cutlass Supreme Cruiser that replaced it. The nameplate was first used by Oldsmobile from 1940 until 1947, denoting the top trim level of its C-body model line (later the Oldsmobile 98). 451,819 Custom Cruisers were sold over the years.

Produced for three generations, the Custom Cruiser shared the General Motors B platform with the Buick Estate, Pontiac Safari, and the Chevrolet Caprice (initially Chevrolet Kingswood) station wagons. Within Oldsmobile, the Custom Cruiser shared its trim with either (or both) the Oldsmobile Delta 88 or Oldsmobile Ninety-Eight. Following the second downsizing of Oldsmobile full-size sedans for 1985-1986, the Custom Cruiser effectively became a stand-alone model line. After the early 1988 discontinuation of the Cutlass Supreme Classic, the model line became the sole Oldsmobile sold with rear-wheel drive.

For the 1991 model year, the Custom Cruiser underwent an extensive redesign alongside its Buick and Chevrolet counterparts. Following the 1992 model year, the Custom Cruiser model line was discontinued. In the early 1990s, the Oldsmobile division began to explore station wagon alternatives; before 1992, the division introduced both a minivan and a mid-size SUV (the Oldsmobile Silhouette and Oldsmobile Bravada, respectively). At the end of the 1996 model year, General Motors ended production of the Buick Roadmaster and Chevrolet Caprice station wagons, marking the end of full-size station wagon production by U.S.-brand manufacturers until the 2005-2008 Dodge Magnum.



First use of name 

The Custom Cruiser nameplate was introduced by Oldsmobile in 1940, as the division introduced formal names for its vehicles for the first time, introducing the flagship Custom Cruiser 90. For 1941, the model line was offered with both inline-6 and inline-8 engines, with Oldsmobile renaming it as the Custom Cruiser 96 and Custom Cruiser 98.

For 1942, the Custom Cruiser 96 was dropped, leaving the 98 as the flagship Oldsmobile. Dropping the Custom Cruiser name after 1947, the 98 (later renamed Ninety-Eight) remained on the C-body chassis through its 1996 discontinuation.

First generation (1971–1976) 

For the 1971 model year, General Motors reintroduced full-size station wagons to Oldsmobile (for the first time since 1964). In place of the previous Fiesta nameplate used for Oldsmobile station wagons, the division revived the Custom Cruiser, slotting it above the A-body Vista Cruiser wagon. Sharing a body with the Buick Estate and Pontiac Safari (Grand Safari), the Custom Cruiser was slightly longer than Chevrolet Impala/Caprice station wagons.

Adopting the interior layout of the intermediate Vista Cruiser, the Custom Cruiser and its counterparts used a forward-facing third-row seat, and access to the third row was accomplished by a second row split bench seat that retracted forward. Chevrolet wagons retained a rear-facing seat. With a total of eight-passenger accommodation (similar to the Chevrolet/GMC Suburban of the time), the first-generation Custom Cruiser wagon was among the largest vehicles ever built by Oldsmobile. The seven passenger version was listed at US$4,680 ($ in  dollars ).

Chassis 
Technically designated as the GM B-body chassis (and given a B-body serial number by GM), the Oldsmobile Custom Cruiser (and its Buick/Pontiac counterparts) adopted the 127-inch wheelbase of the C-body chassis; shared with the Oldsmobile Ninety-Eight sedan, the Custom Cruiser used a longer wheelbase than Ford/Mercury station wagons (121 inches), the AMC Ambassador (122 inches), and all Chrysler station wagons (124 inches).

In contrast to the rest of the GM B/C/D-platform vehicles of the time, GM 1971-1976 full-size station wagons used a truck-style rear suspension of multi-leaf springs (in lieu of rear coil springs).

At  shipping weight ( with woodgrain), or about  curb weight, the three-seat 1974 Custom Cruiser wagons are the heaviest Oldsmobiles ever built (along with similar versions of the Buick Estate, the model line also serves as the heaviest sedan-based GM vehicle ever produced).

Powertrain
Oldsmobile offered the 455 cubic-inch Rocket V8 in various states of tune from 1971 until 1976 (though the "Rocket" brand was discontinued in 1975). A 190 hp 400 cubic-inch Pontiac V8 was offered for 1975.

For the entire production of the first-generation Custom Cruiser, the GM Turbo-Hydramatic 400 3-speed automatic was the sole transmission paired with either engine.

Body 
Developed effectively as a hybrid of the Delta 88 and the Ninety-Eight, the Custom Cruiser used components from both model lines. From the Ninety-Eight, the Custom Cruiser adopted the front fascia and rear quarter panels (and its fender skirts); the Custom Cruiser adopted interior trim elements from both the Delta 88 and Ninety-Eight.

As with its Buick and Pontiac counterparts (and the Mercury Colony Park and Chrysler Town & Country), the Custom Cruiser was offered with simulated woodgrain trim, with nearly 80% of buyers ordering the option.

Following the exterior of the Ninety-Eight, the Custom Cruiser was given a new front bumper for 1972. For 1973 and 1974, Oldsmobile added 5-mph bumpers to the front and rear, respectively. For 1974, the grille was redesigned.

For 1976, the Custom Cruiser received a second revision. Largely a preview of the 1977 Oldsmobile 98, the fascia was given four square headlights with outboard marker lights.

Clamshell tailgate design 

Along with all other 1971-1976 General Motors full-size station wagons built on the B-platform, first-generation Custom Cruiser wagons feature a "clamshell" tailgate design. A two-piece tailgate configuration, the tailgate slid into a recess under the cargo floor while the rear glass window retracted up into the roof; the design operated either manually or with optional power assist.

The first powered tailgate in automotive history, the powered option ultimately became standard, as the manual tailgate required a degree of effort to lift out of storage. The system was operated from either an instrument panel switch or by key on the rear quarter panel. The clamshell tailgate was intended to aid the loading of the 19-foot long station wagons in tight parking spaces. Heavy and complex, the system was not included in the 1977 full-sized station wagons (shorter by over a foot and over 1000 pounds lighter); instead, GM developed its own two-way tailgate (a design developed by Ford).

Production Figures
Note: 1971-1976 model years are the only production figures that Oldsmobile broke down specifically by body configuration (i.e., woodgrain, two-row or three-row seating)

Second generation (1977–1990) 

For the 1977 model year, as part of a downsizing of the entire GM full-size range, the Oldsmobile Custom Cruiser was redesigned, becoming a direct counterpart of the Delta 88 sedan. While interior space was reduced only marginally, its exterior footprint saw extensive change, with the full-size Custom Cruiser and the intermediate Vista Cruiser/Cutlass Supreme wagon briefly switching places as the longest Oldsmobile station wagon (for 1977 only, as GM intermediates underwent a similar downsizing for 1978).

As with the previous generation, the Custom Cruiser shared its body with the Buick Estate, Chevrolet Impala wagon/Caprice Estate, and Pontiac Safari. Following the exit of Chrysler from the segment after the 1977 model year, the Custom Cruiser primarily competed against the Ford LTD Country Squire and Mercury Colony Park, which remained in production through 1991.

Following the 1985 model year, GM shifted Buick, Oldsmobile, and Pontiac versions of the B-body sedans to the front-wheel drive H-platform with a further round of downsizing, with station wagons becoming distinct model lines on the B platform (only the Chevrolet Caprice remained as both a sedan and station wagon).

Chassis 
The second-generation Oldsmobile Custom Cruiser (as with all full-size GM station wagons) is based on the GM B-platform. As part of the GM downsizing, station wagons were consolidated upon a common 115.9 inch wheelbase shared with wagons of all three mid-price divisions and Chevrolet (and all B-platform sedans). In the redesign, the Custom Cruiser shed 14 inches in length, 11 inches of wheelbase, and up to 900 pounds of curb weight (though becoming taller). Though sharing its wheelbase with the intermediate Vista Cruiser (and nearly 200 pounds lighter) prior to its 1978 replacement, the Custom Cruiser remained in the full-size segment, as its body was several inches wider and taller.

As Buick, Oldsmobile, Pontiac (and most Cadillac) full-size sedans were downsized further to the front-wheel drive C-body and H-body platforms in the mid-1980s, after 1986, the rear-wheel drive B-platform remained solely for the Chevrolet Caprice and Buick, Oldsmobile, and Pontiac station wagons (with the Pontiac Safari ending production after 1989).

Powertrain
At its 1977 launch, the second-generation Custom Cruiser was offered with two engines, a 170 hp 350 cubic-inch Oldsmobile V8, with a 185 hp 403 cubic-inch Oldsmobile V8 as an option. For 1979, both engines were detuned: the 350 was detuned to 160 hp and the 403 offered 175 hp. After 1980, both the 350 and the 403 were replaced by the 307.

For 1980, Oldsmobile introduced its third (and last) V8 engine for the B-platform, the 307. Initially producing 150 hp, the 307 was detuned to 140 hp for 1981. For 1985, new "swirl port" cylinder heads were given to the 307. While engine horsepower was not increased, the design increased torque and driveability; at the expense of high RPM power and performance, the heads featured relatively small intake ports. Along with the new cylinder heads, roller lifters replaced flat lifters.

For 1980 in California-market examples, Oldsmobile introduced a new E4ME electronic carburetor, using CCC (Computer Command Control); in 1981, the 4-barrel carburetor was adopted in all 50 states, replacing the previous mechanical M4ME version. In Canada, E4ME was not adopted until 1986.

1977-1990 Custom Cruisers were fitted with two different automatic transmissions. From 1977 until 1980, the 3-speed THM200 was the sole transmission. From 1981 through 1990, the THM200-4R 4-speed automatic with overdrive was added, as GM added a lock-up torque converter and a 0.67:1 overdrive ratio. With the overdrive transmission, the Custom Cruiser drive with a numerically higher rear axle ratio for better performance, while offering improved fuel economy with the overdrive range

In its final year of production, the second-generation Custom Cruiser marked the end of the Oldsmobile-produced V8 (formerly the "Rocket V8"). Shifting from its long-running practice of each division developing its own engines, during the 1980s, GM consolidated V8 production in non-Cadillac full-size cars towards Chevrolet and Oldsmobile, with the latter division developing diesel engines. Towards the end of the decade, GM phased out the Oldsmobile V8 family, as the 307 was the final engine produced by the company without fuel injection. After 1990, Oldsmobile would not have a division-produced engine; the only GM division-unique engine family developed since 1990 was the Cadillac Northstar (developed with some Oldsmobile and Pontiac applications).

Oldsmobile diesel V8 
For 1978, Oldsmobile introduced its first diesel engine, a naturally aspirated 120 hp 350 cubic-inch V8. For 1980, the V8 was retuned to 105 hp, remaining an option through 1985.

Body 

In contrast to the 1971-1976 Custom Cruiser, Oldsmobile styled the 1977 Custom Cruiser as a station wagon version of the Delta 88, adopting its front fascia entirely. To distinguish itself from its nearly identical Buick, Chevrolet, and Pontiac counterparts, the Custom Cruiser was given its simulated wood design, with wood following the curve of the wheel wells.

In a major departure from the 2-piece "clamshell" tailgate of its predecessor, the Custom Cruiser was fitted with a two-way tailgate; similar to configurations offered by Ford and Chrysler, the two-way tailgate opened to the side as a door or hinged down as a tailgate (with the rear window glass retracted). The third-row seat made its return, allowing for 8-passenger seating; to allow for production commonality on a single wheelbase, the Custom Cruiser was produced with a rear-facing third row seat (as were all full-size GM station wagons).

Alongside all B-platform station wagons and sedans, the Custom Cruiser saw an exterior update for 1980, with wagons receiving a new front fascia. To aid aerodynamics and fuel economy the grille and front fascia were redesigned, with the headlamps mounted closer to the front bumpers. Similar to the other B-body Oldsmobile's, the Custom Cruiser gained wraparound front marker lights. In a minor change, the design of the simulated woodgrain adopted the common layout used by Buick and Chevrolet, joining the headlamps and taillamps.

From 1980 until 1990, the exterior and interior of the Oldsmobile Custom Cruiser saw almost no visible change, besides a small front fascia swap in 1985. Instead of the split-grille style from 1980-1984, the Custom Cruiser was now fitted with a single, wider grille. Along with the wider grille came a sharper header panel, instead of curving off on the edge. In 1986, the rear tailgate saw the addition of a federally mandated third brake light. In 1989, the seat belts in the B-body lineup were modified to meet federal safety standards. The rear outboard seats were fitted with shoulder belts and as the platform was not designed for airbags, the front shoulder belts were shifted from the B-pillar to the front doors for 1990, allowing the seat belts to remain buckled at all times.

Production figures

Third generation (1991–1992) 

For the 1991 model year, General Motors redesigned its full-size B-body sedans and station wagons for the first time since 1977. While chassis underpinnings saw little change, the bodies and interior saw substantial revisions. The Custom Cruiser received functional upgrades such as anti-lock brakes, a driver-side airbag, and fuel-injected engines. The Custom Cruiser was marketed between a redesigned Chevrolet Caprice Estate and the Buick Roadmaster Estate (replacing the Buick Estate); Pontiac did not offer a version of the model line (as the Pontiac Safari was retired after 1989). In contrast to Chevrolet and Buick, Oldsmobile did not market a B-body sedan (with the front-wheel drive Oldsmobile 98 remaining as its largest sedan).

Sold only in the United States, the 1991 Custom Cruiser improved its sales over 1990 nearly two-to-one, slightly outselling the Buick Roadmaster (produced only as a station wagon for 1991); the Custom Cruiser also outsold the combined sales of the 1991 Ford LTD Country Squire and Mercury Colony Park (in their final year). For 1992, the Custom Cruiser declined closer to its 1990 sales, leading Oldsmobile to discontinue the model line for 1993. On June 5, 1992, the final Custom Cruiser was produced.

Along with serving as the final full-size Oldsmobile station wagon, the 1992 Custom Cruiser was the final rear-wheel drive Oldsmobile produced with a V8 engine. The Custom Cruiser was also the final Oldsmobile produced only with a 3-passenger front bench seat; all subsequent vehicles produced by the division were sold with 2-passenger front seating as standard or as an option.

In place of the Custom Cruiser, Oldsmobile concentrated on the marketing of the Bravada SUV and Silhouette minivan. Until its 1996 discontinuation, the Buick Roadmaster Estate was marketed as a functional replacement for the Custom Cruiser (as Buick would not market a minivan or SUV under its own brand until after the closure of Oldsmobile).

Chassis 
The 1991 and 1992 Oldsmobile Custom Cruiser is based upon the GM B platform. Sharing its wheelbase with the 1977-1990 B-platform, the third-generation Custom Cruiser and its counterparts are largely re-bodied versions of their predecessors. Primarily through the addition of additional safety equipment, the redesign of the Custom Cruiser added nearly 100 pounds of weight to the vehicle (though nearly 650 pounds lighter than a 1976 counterpart).

Following the 1992 discontinuation of the Custom Cruiser, the Buick Roadmaster Estate and Chevrolet Caprice Estate were produced with no major changes (to the B-body platform) through their 1996 discontinuation, outside of the 1994 replacement of the L05 V8 with the LT1 V8 for 1994.

Powertrain

As part of the redesign of the GM B platform for 1991, General Motors retired divisionally-produced engines (in favor of the Chevrolet small-block V8) for the B platform. The long-running Oldsmobile 307 was replaced by a 170hp 5.0 L V8 (a 30hp increase); in a first for a rear-wheel drive Oldsmobile, the V8 was fuel-injected. For 1992, a 180hp 5.7 L V8 was introduced as an option.

Both engines were paired with the Hydramatic 4L60 4-speed overdrive automatic (replacing the THM200-4R).

Body 

As with the previous generation, the Custom Cruiser shared nearly its entire body with its Chevrolet and Buick counterparts, sharing design features from both model lines. The use of chrome was reduced, with plastic-covered 5-mph bumpers replacing the previous steel bumpers. Shared with the Buick Roadmaster Estate, the Custom Cruiser was fitted with a fixed second-row skylight allowing for a slightly raised rear roofline (similar to the Vista Cruiser); the body-color split grille derived much of its design from the Chevrolet Caprice.

To distinguish the Custom Cruiser from its Buick and Chevrolet counterparts, the model line was fitted with standard two-tone paint; alloy wheels were offered as an option. In contrast to the Roadmaster Estate, the Custom Cruiser no longer had exterior woodgrain trim. Though sharing its dashboard and interior trim elements with the Roadmaster, the Custom Cruiser was fitted with its own seat and wood trim design; cloth-trim seats were standard and leather-trim seats were an option. In contrast to its predecessors, the third-generation Custom Cruiser was given an instrument panel with full instrumentation, including tachometer, oil pressure, voltage, and coolant temperature. 

As a consequence of its aerodynamically-sloped rear window, the three-way tailgate of the previous generation was replaced in favor of a hatch-type rear window (adding a rear windscreen wiper) and a two-way tailgate. In line with the mid-size Cutlass Cruiser/Buick Century station wagons, the Custom Cruiser offered pop-out vent windows in the cargo area to aid airflow and ventilation.

Production figures

References

External links 

Oldsmobile Club of America
GM Skywagon Club (recognizes 1991-92 models as Skywagons)

Full-size vehicles
Custom Cruiser
Rear-wheel-drive vehicles
Station wagons
1970s cars
1980s cars
1990s cars